The Fort Wayne Fusion was a 2007 af2 (Arena Football League's minor league) expansion team in the Midwest Division of the American Conference. They played their home games at the Allen County War Memorial Coliseum in Fort Wayne, Indiana, which was the former home of the defunct National Indoor Football League/United Indoor Football franchise, the Fort Wayne Freedom.

After only one year of existence, the Fusion folded and a new version of the Fort Wayne Freedom was formed for the Continental Indoor Football League.

History
The franchise was announced in November, 2006 as an expansion team of the af2. Jeremy Golden was announced as the team's owner and general manager, and secured a lease with Allen County War Memorial Coliseum for home games. The team also announced that Arena Football League legend, Eddie Brown, would be the team first head coach. In January, the team named Mike McCaffrey as the team's General Manager to handle day-to-day operations for the Fusion. In February, the team announced the team colors would be Burnt Orange, Regal Purple and Pearl White. With the team struggling to find a quarterback through their exhibition games, the Fusion traded for Cody Hodges of the Oklahoma City Yard Dawgz. The Fusion played their first game in the af2 on March 31, 2007 against the Green Bay Blizzard, who were the then-defending American Conference champions. In July, 2007, the news surfaced that Owner Jeremy Golden had been removed as the owner of the Fusion by af2 Commissioner, Jerry Kurz. The Fusion finished the season 5-11, but with the loss of Golden during the season, the Fusion playing again in 2008 was very remote. In October, the city learned that Kurz had determined that the Fusion would not return in 2008.

2007 Schedule
The Fort Wayne Fusion's schedule for the 2007 season is as follows: (Home Games in bold)

Season-by-season

|-
|2007 || 5 || 11 || 0 || 4th AC Midwest || --
|}

Final roster

Coaches of note

Head coaches
Note: Statistics are correct through the end of the 2007 af2 season.

Coaching staff

See also
 History of sports in Fort Wayne, Indiana

References

External links
 Official af2 Website 
 Fort Wayne Fusion Official Stats at TheStatGuys.com
 Fort Wayne Fusion Website
 Fort Wayne Fusion at ArenaFan.com

Defunct af2 teams
Sports in Fort Wayne, Indiana
Defunct American football teams in Indiana
American football teams established in 2006
American football teams disestablished in 2007
2006 establishments in Indiana
2007 disestablishments in Indiana